Hawa Bodol is a 2013 Indian Bengali comedy film directed by Parambrata Chattopadhyay. The film revolves around two childhood friends, who met each other coincidentally after a long time, and somehow their lives swapped after a night of endless drinks. The movie is an  Bengali language "remake" of the 2011 American film The Change-Up.

Plot 
The movie revolves around two old school friends, Satrajeet aka Jeet (Parambrata Chattopadhyay) and Rajarshi aka Raj (Rudranil Ghosh) who coincidentally came across each after a long time. While Jeet, a partner in a big architect firm, which he inherited from his deceased father-in-law; Raj is a struggling singer in a band. Jeet and Raj were invited to a party of a non-Bengali business client of Jeet, where Raj flirted with the businessman's daughter Inka (Neha Panda). After party, both the friends bought drinks from closed shops and drank in the open. Both of them wished they had each other life. After getting up from sleep, both of them found that their soul has interchanged. Both of the friends were surprised to find themselves in that situation. While both of them tried to be loyal, but found it difficult to live in each other's life. In the meanwhile Raj (in Jeet's body) visited Chandannagar, his home town to meet his parents, which he left years ago to make a career in singing. Even, Jeet (in Raj's body) came to visit his house to see his child. Inka came to stay with Raj (actually Jeet's soul) after she had a fight with her parents. Both the friends tried to manage each other's work. While, Raj gave an interesting solution of using terracotta in bathroom instead of gold plates to the Indonesian clients. Jeet, on the other hand introduced Inka as a lead singer in their band, whose performance was well appreciated. The two friends, decided to get back to each other's life, they repeated the same acts they did on the day they interchanged and were successful in getting back their souls in their own body. The movie ended with Raj going for a trip to Chandannagar to visit his parents, and Jeet going on a family trip.

Cast 
 Raima Sen as Tanuka
 Parambrata Chattopadhyay as Jeet
 Rudranil Ghosh as Raj
 Neha Panda as Inka
 Dwijen Bandopadhyay
Kaushik Ganguly as music producer

Reception 
The movie opened to mixed reviews and had a good run of 5 weeks collecting 16 million in week one. The movie collected 5 million in week 2 and the total box office collection after five weeks was 20 million.

Soundtrack 
The Hawa Bodol soundtrack's music director is Indradeep Dasgupta with lyrics penned by Angshuman Chakraborty & Prosen. One of Rabindranath Tagore's songs ("Mor Bhabonare") is also included in this soundtrack.

References

External links 
 

Bengali-language Indian films
2010s Bengali-language films
2013 comedy-drama films
Films set in Kolkata
Indian comedy films
2013 films
Films scored by Indradeep Dasgupta